Jan Kapras (1880 – 1947) was a Czechoslovak jurist and politician.

After studies in Innsbruck and Prague, he achieved habilitation in Bohemian legal history and was appointed professor at the University of Prague in 1910. He authored many works on Bohemian legal history, and substantially influenced the field with his principal work Právní dějiny zemí Koruny české (1913–20).

After 1918, Kapras was mainly active in politics. Representing the National Democratic Party, he was elected senator in 1929 and held that office until 1935. From 1938 to 39, he was minister of education in the last pre-war Czechoslovakian government, and continued in that office in the German occupation government of the Protectorate of Bohemia and Moravia from 1939 to 42. Suspected by the Gestapo, he was eventually dismissed from his office.

References

 

1880 births
1947 deaths
Czechoslovak jurists
Academic staff of Charles University
National Partnership politicians